Dee Dee Bridgewater is a studio album by American jazz singer Dee Dee Bridgewater. Originally released in 1980 by Elektra label, this is her second self-titled album. Two singles were released off the album: "One in a Million (Guy)" and "When Love Comes Knockin'. The album was re-released on CD in 2006.

Track listing

Personnel

Band
Dee Dee Bridgewater – vocals
Thom Bell, Casey James – keyboards
Don Renaldo and His Strings and Horns – horns, strings
Grant Reeves – saxophone
Bobby Eli, Bill Neale – guitar
Bob Babbitt – bass
Charles Collins – drums
Leroy Bell, Larry Washington  – percussion
Barbara Ingram, Carla Benson, Evette Benton, Frankie Bleu, Carl Helm, George Merrill – backing vocals

Production
Thom Bell – producer, conductor
Dirk Devlin, Jim Gallagher, Ron Gangnes – recording engineers
Ron Coro – art direction, design
David Alexander – photography

References

External links 

Dee Dee Bridgewater albums
1980 albums
albums produced by Thom Bell
Elektra Records albums
albums recorded at Sigma Sound Studios